UK International Airlines was a British airline based in Sheffield, England, United Kingdom. UK International Airlines Limited held a United Kingdom Civil Aviation Authority Type A Operating Licence permitting it to carry passengers, cargo and mail on aircraft with 20 or more seats, for a very short period of time.

On 8 January 2008 the UK Civil Aviation Authority suspended the AOC held by UK International Airlines.  It has also suspended the Route licences for both charter and scheduled operations held by the airline.

History
UK International Airlines Limited was formed on 13 September 2005  to operate services between United Kingdom and Pakistan. The airline was awarded its worldwide scheduled Air Operator’s Certificate (AOC)  and Type A Operating Licence (OL)  on 5 September 2007 from the UK CAA.

The license and AOC was surrendered by the company.

The airline commenced services on 19 October 2007 with a flight from East Midlands Airport to Sharjah and Islamabad.

Suspension of services
UKIA have suspended all operations since 27 December 2007. The company cites ongoing concerns about the fleet and problems with security at Islamabad International Airport. The UK International Airlines website now redirects to a holding page and all traces of the airline seem to have disappeared.

Destinations
The airline formerly served the following destinations prior to ceasing operations.

It suspended charter flights and scheduled services due to security issues raised by UKDTI.

Pakistan
Islamabad International Airport 
United Arab Emirates
Sharjah International Airport
United Kingdom
East Midlands Airport

Fleet
 Boeing 767-200 registered as G-CECU. It was originally registered as N603UA with United Airlines. It was withdrawn and put into storage in Victoriaville Airport, California. It was in storage between 29th March 2005 and 30 August 2006. It entered service with UK International Airlines in Jan 2007. It was finally withdrawn from service on the 23rd December 2007 and put into storage at East Midlands Airport. It was scrapped at East Midlands Airport in April 2011.
 Boeing 767-200 registered as G-CEMK. It was intended to enter service with UK International Airlines but It never made it into service before the airline ceased operations. It was originally registered as N604UA with United Airlines in Jan 1983. It was put into storage at Brunei International Airport in December 2006 and was reregistered to G-CEMK in February 2007 but never entered service. In 2009 it was scrapped at Brunei International Airlines.

See also
 List of defunct airlines of the United Kingdom

References

External links
 UK International No longer active

Defunct airlines of the United Kingdom
Airlines established in 2005
Airlines disestablished in 2008
2005 establishments in England
2008 disestablishments in England
British companies disestablished in 2008
British companies established in 2005